Asaphodes oxyptera is a species of moth in the family Geometridae. This species is endemic to New Zealand and is only found in the Auckland Islands.

Taxonomy
This species was first described by George Hudson in 1909 using a specimen collected by A. A. Dorrien-Smith at North Arm, Carnley Harbour, Auckland Island and named Xanthorhoe oxyptera. Hudson went on to discuss and illustrate this species in his book The butterflies and moths of New Zealand. In 1964 Dugdale illustrated the male genitalia of this species. In 1971 J. S. Dugdale placed this species in the genus Asaphodes. In 1988 Dugdale confirmed this placement in his catalogue of New Zealand Lepidoptera. The male holotype specimen is held at Te Papa.

Description 

Hudson described this species as follows:

Distribution

This species is endemic to the Auckland Islands of New Zealand and has been found on  Adams Island and Auckland Island.

References

Larentiinae
Moths described in 1909
Moths of New Zealand
Endemic fauna of New Zealand
Taxa named by George Hudson
Fauna of the Auckland Islands
Endemic moths of New Zealand